The marsh grassbird (Helopsaltes pryeri), also known as the Japanese swamp warbler, is a species of Old World warbler in the family Locustellidae. It is found in China, Japan, South Korea, Mongolia, and Russia.

Its natural habitat is swamps. It is threatened by habitat loss.

References

marsh grassbird
Birds of East Asia
Birds of Manchuria
marsh grassbird
marsh grassbird
Taxonomy articles created by Polbot